The Power To Believe Tour Box is a live album by King Crimson. Packaged in a DVD snapcase and includes a 20-page booklet with photographs, equipment lists, and extra notes regarding the albums and tours. Available only from the merchandise booth on their 2003 tour dates, or direct from the Discipline Global Mobile mail order store.

Track listing 
 Sushi on Sunset - Press Conference (I) (2:46)
 Sushi on Sunset - Press Conference (II) (4:12)
 Sushi on Sunset - Press Conference (III) (3:27)
 Sushi on Sunset - Press Conference (IV) (1:52)
 Sushi on Sunset - Press Conference (V) (1:07)
 Sushi on Sunset - Press Conference (VI) (1:35)
 Sushi on Sunset - Press Conference (VII) (1:14)
 Happy with What You Have to Be Happy With (Demo) (3:13)
 Sushi on Sunset - Press Conference (Reprise) (0:53)
 Message 22 (5:22)
 Emerald Banter (0:58)
 Superslow (4:33)
 UMJ Offices Japan - Television Interview (I) (1:56)
 UMJ Offices Japan - Television Interview (II) (4:58)
 UMJ Offices Japan - Television Interview (III) (1:28)
 UMJ Offices Japan - Television Interview (IV) (1:01)
 UMJ Offices Japan - Television Interview (V) (3:44)
 UMJ Offices Japan - Television Interview (VI) (3:02)
 UMJ Offices Japan - Television Interview (VII) (4:43)
 Sus-tayn-Z Suite (I) (3:22)
 Sus-tayn-Z Suite (II) (4:46)
 Sus-tayn Z Suite (III) (4:44)

"Sushi on Sunset" is an interview with Robert Fripp, Trey Gunn and Adrian Belew; the UMJ segment is with Fripp only.

Personnel 
 Robert Fripp – Guitar
 Adrian Belew – Guitar, Vocals, Percussion
 Trey Gunn – Warr Guitar
 Pat Mastelotto – Drums, Drum Programming

Albums produced by Robert Fripp
2003 live albums
Interview albums
King Crimson live albums
Discipline Global Mobile albums